Siddhant (also spelled Siddhanth, translation: Principle) is an Indian TV show starring Pawan Shankar in the title role, broadcast on the now defunct Star One channel from 1 December 2004 – 9 November 2005. It was produced by Anurradha Prasad (BAG films) and was nominated for an International Emmy Award.

Cast 
 Pawan Shankar as Advocate Siddhant Mehra
 Suhita Thatte as Mrs Deshpande (Siddhant's landlady)
 Tasneem Sheikh as Shruti Saxena
 Sai Deodhar as Journalist Hemangi Mathur
 Ashwini Kalsekar as ACP Netra Menon
 Pooja Ghai Rawal as Anamika Arekar
 Ravee Gupta as Navya, Siddhant's assistant 
 Tom Alter as Mr. Arekar
 Gaurav Khanna as Tanmay Bakshi
 Shishir Sharma as Home Minister Saxena
 Keerti Gaekwad Kelkar as Deepa
 Bakul Thakkar as Advocate Anand
 Sujata Sehgal
 Arun Bali as Mr. Qureshi
 Bobby Parvez
 Nasirr Khan as Advocate
 Rajiv Kumar
 Murli Sharma as Advocate
Aasif Sheikh

References

External links
 

Star One (Indian TV channel) original programming
2005 Indian television series debuts
2006 Indian television series endings
Hindi-language television shows